Barriers and Passages is the fourth album by Progressive rock band Dysrhythmia. It is their first to feature bassist Colin Marston.

Track listing

References 

Dysrhythmia (band) albums
2006 albums
Relapse Records albums